Altynay Sapargaliyeva (pronounced [ɑltəˈnɑj sɑpɑrʁɑləjevˈnɑ]; born 30 November 1989) is a Kazakh singer who placed third in SuperStar KZ 3.

As a child, she sang a member of the girl's group Chinatown. She has performed in the Kazakh teen competition "Anshi Balapan", the "Jakhan Dala" competition in Aqtau, and the New Wave competition in Jurmala, Latvia.

Sapargaliyeva moved to New York City in 2010.

References

1989 births
Living people
People from Zhanaozen
Idols (franchise) participants
21st-century Kazakhstani women singers
SuperStar KZ